A Bag of Hammers is a 2011 American comedy-drama film directed by Brian Crano and written by Crano and Jake Sandvig, who co-stars in the film with Jason Ritter. The soundtrack was written and performed by British folk musician Johnny Flynn.

Plot
Ben and Alan are great friends who have known each other since high school, and they haven't grown up. For a living, they pose as valets at funerals and then steal their customers' cars and sell them to a pessimistic car dealer. Melanie, Alan's sister, encourages them to find respectable occupations, but Ben and Alan don't take Mel's advice. Then, Lynette moves into their neighborhood. She is a single mother who is financially insecure and has a short temper, as Mel finds out. When Lynette commits suicide, Alan and Ben take her son Kelsey under their wing. With the help of an unenthusiastic Mel, who deems their idea crazy, they try to involve him within their car-theft scheme. However, they come to realize that Kelsey needs more suitable role models, and Ben and Alan will have to grow up.

Cast
 Jason Ritter as Ben Dwellman
 Jake Sandvig as Alan Manilow
 Chandler Canterbury as Kelsey Patterson
 Johnny Simmons as Kelsey, age 18
 Rebecca Hall as Melanie "Mel" Manilow
 Carrie Preston as Lynette Patterson
 Todd Louiso as Marty
 Gabriel Macht as Wyatt
 Amanda Seyfried as Amanda Beekler 
 Micah Hauptman as Vince Ortega
 Elmarie Wendel as The Mark

Reception

Critical response
A Bag of Hammers received mixed reviews. Website Metacritic gave the film a score of 50 out of 100, indicating "mixed or average reviews". , the film holds an approval rating of 62% on review aggregator Rotten Tomatoes, based on 21 reviews with an average rating of 5.42/10. Andy Webster of The New York Times wrote in his review: "A Bag of Hammers, Brian Crano's low-budget dramedy and first feature, is certainly sure of itself. Any film tossing comic interludes among its closing credits has to be convinced of their hilarity and of the good will the movie has earned with viewers by then. Perhaps the film's naked traffic in sentiment up to that point made Mr. Crano so bold. Whatever; his confidence was unwarranted." John DeFore of The Hollywood Reporter wrote in his review: "First-time director Brian Crano delivers a muddled comedy starring Jason Ritter and Rebecca Hall about two felons who unexpectedly wind up taking care of a neglected child."

Scott Tobias of The A.V. Club enjoyed the film and gave it a B−.

Other reviewers, such as Nick Schager of Time Out New York hated the film, giving it one star out of five.

Release
A Bag of Hammers was released for a limited time starting March 12, 2011, at the SXSW festival and in theatres May 12, 2012. The film was released on DVD on June 19, 2012, by MPI Home Video.

Accolades

References

External links
 
 
 

2011 films
2011 comedy-drama films
American comedy-drama films
American independent films
Films shot in Los Angeles
2011 directorial debut films
2011 independent films
2010s English-language films
2010s American films